Robert Arthur Gislingham (13 April 1908 – 3 November 1982) was an Australian rules footballer who played with Richmond in the Victorian Football League (VFL).

Family
The son of George Gislingham (1873-1950), and Elizabeth "Lizzie" Gislingham (1877-1941), née Fisk, Robert Arthur Gislingham was born at Richmond, Victoria on 13 April 1908.

He married Ellen Law Lyon (1913-1990) on 29 June 1929.

Football

St Stephen's (MJL)
From 1927 to 1930 he played for the Richmond district amateur football church team, St Stephen's, in the Metropolitan Junior League. He won that League's best and fairest award in 1930.

Richmond (VFL)
Over three seasons (1930 to 1933) he played in 35 games for the Richmond Seconds, scoring 15 goals, winning the team's best and fairest award in 1932. Named several times as an emergency, he played one match for the Richmond First XVIII, against Collingwood, at Victoria Park, on 5 August 1933. Gislingham broke his leg in the 1934 pre-season and did not play for Richmond again.

Military service

Second AIF
He enlisted in the Second AIF on 25 April 1940.

Court-martial
In November 1940, both Gislingham and Cornelius Streefkirk (VX13103)  were charged with number of offences following a vicious assault they perpetrated, while stationed at Dayr Sunayd in Palestine, upon a sleeping Private William James Hardy (VX10501), in his tent, in the process of attempting to rob Hardy of £30 gambling winnings that he carried around his waist.

Hardy, upon waking, and finding Streefkirk straddling him and groping around his waist for the cash, immediately resisted; upon which Streefkirk began battering him with a tin helmet, and Gislingham began striking him over his head with the heel of a boot (the boot would have had a metal protective heel-plate) that he (Gislingham) held by its toe.

The court found both soldiers guilty of a civil offence. The court's sentence was that, in each case, the soldier was to be discharged from the Defence Force and to be imprisoned with hard labour for two years. Private Gislingham returned to Australia in August 1941, was discharged as S.N.L.R. ("services no longer required"), and was immediately incarcerated, as a civilian, at Pentridge Gaol, where he served out his sentence.

Footnotes

References
 
 Hogan P: The Tigers Of Old, Richmond FC, (Melbourne), 1996. : note that Hogan (pp.84, 306) has him as "Thomas Gillingham", and has his date of birth as 16 April 1907.
 Junior League: Player Suspended for Rest of Season, The Age, (Saturday, 14 July 1934), p.16.
 Used Fence as Ammunition: Disturbance "Like Civil War", The (Sydney) Sun, (Tuesday, 17 November 1936), p.12.
 Two Homes Wrecked: Sequel to Trifling Argument, The Age, (Wednesday, 18 November 1936), p.17.
 Assault, The Argus, (Thursday, 18 August 1938), p.12.
 Proceedings of the Court-Martial of Private Cornelius Streefkirk (VX13103) and Private Robert Arthur Gislingham (VX12918), held at Deir Suneid on 14 and 15 November 1940, National Archives of Australia.
 World War Two Service Record: Private Robert Arthur Gislingham (VX12918), National Archives of Australia.
 World War Two Nominal Roll: Private Robert Arthur Gislingham (VX12918), Department of Veterans' Affairs.

External links 

1908 births
1982 deaths
Australian rules footballers from Victoria (Australia)
Richmond Football Club players
Australian Army personnel of World War II
Australian Army soldiers
People who were court-martialed
Prisoners and detainees of Australia